Clondavaddog is a parish in the Diocese of Raphoe. Clondavaddog is situated at the northern part of the Fanad peninsula in County Donegal in Ulster, Ireland.

History

The most relevant event in Irish history to have happened locally was the killing of the pro-British local Protestant minister, The Rev. William Hamilton, in March 1797, by an angry mob. This was one of several precursors to the Irish Rebellion of 1798.

Notable people
Henry Maturin (1842–1920), Irish cricketer and physician

References

Civil parishes of County Donegal